The 1999 Auburn Tigers football team represented Auburn University in the 1999 NCAA Division I-A football season.  Under first-year head coach Tommy Tuberville, Auburn finished the season with a record of 5–6, including a Southeastern Conference record of 2–6.

Schedule

Roster

References

Auburn
Auburn Tigers football seasons
Auburn Tigers football